Jan Seifert (born 14 October 1968) is a German former professional footballer who played as a defender. He now works as a football coach.

External links
 
 

1968 births
Living people
German footballers
East German footballers
Association football defenders
FC Erzgebirge Aue players
Chemnitzer FC players
SC Freiburg players
1. FC Lokomotive Leipzig players
FSV Zwickau players
SpVgg Unterhaching players
Dynamo Dresden players
German football managers
Dynamo Dresden non-playing staff
Bundesliga players
2. Bundesliga players
DDR-Oberliga players
People from Mittelsachsen
Footballers from Saxony